Stephen A. Coutchie (August 6, 1899 – January 24, 1983) was an American football player and coach. He served as the head football coach at Arizona State Teachers College at Tempe, now Arizona State University, in 1946, compiling a record of 2–7–2. Before coming to Arizona State, Coutchie coached both football and basketball at Mesa Union High School in Mesa, Arizona, winning a combined five state championships (two football, three basketball). He attended Thornton Township High School in Harvey, Illinois and played football as a quarterback at the University of Illinois at Urbana–Champaign from 1922 to 1923.

Head coaching record

College

References

External links
 

1899 births
1983 deaths
American football quarterbacks
Arizona State Sun Devils football coaches
Illinois Fighting Illini football players
High school football coaches in Arizona
People from Harvey, Illinois
Players of American football from Illinois